Lucy Prebble  (born 1981) is a British playwright. She is the author of the plays The Sugar Syndrome, The Effect, ENRON and A Very Expensive Poison. For television she adapted Secret Diary of a Call Girl and co-created I Hate Suzie with her close friend Billie Piper. Since 2018, Prebble is Co-Executive Producer and writer on Succession.<ref>{{cite news| url=https://deadline.com/2019/11/succession-hbo-lucy-prebble-american-werewolf-london-wellcome-fellowship-1202796832/| title=Succession' Scribe Lucy Prebble Talks Potential Season 3 Storyline, A Horror Project Inspired By A Cult Classic & What The Wellcome Fellowship Means To Her|author= Andreas Wiseman | work= Deadline | date= 28 November 2019}}</ref>

Biography
Prebble grew up in Haslemere, Surrey, and was educated at Guildford High School. While studying English at the University of Sheffield, Prebble wrote a short play called Liquid, which won the PMA Most Promising Playwright Award. She received the Distinguished Alumni Award in 2014.

Theatre

Prebble's first play, The Sugar Syndrome was performed at the Royal Court in 2003  and won her the George Devine Award, followed by the TMA Award for Best New Play in October 2004.

Her next theatre project ENRON, was based on the financial scandal and collapse of the American energy corporation of the same name. It was produced by theatre company Headlong at the Chichester Festival Theatre in 2009, under the direction of Rupert Goold. The production transferred first to the Royal Court and subsequently to the Noël Coward Theatre. The play earned Prebble an Olivier Award nomination for Best New Play. The production's Broadway transfer opened at the Broadhurst Theatre in April 2010 but failed to match the critical acclaim it received in the UK and closed the following month.Kuchwara, Michael. "Tony nominations are not enough to save 'Enron'" chron.com,7  May 2010The Effect, a study of love and neuroscience, premiered at the National Theatre in 2012, won the 2012 Critics' Circle Award for Best Play. The Effect premiered in the US Off-Broadway at the Barrow Street Theatre on 2 March 2016, directed by David Cromer, and featuring Kati Brazda, Susannah Flood, Carter Hudson and Steve Key. In 2019, it was listed in The Independent as one of the 40 most "continually rewarding" plays.

In April 2017 it was announced that Prebble was working on a new play, based on Bizet’s Carmen, from the new Bridge Theatre in London.

In October 2018, London's Old Vic announced Prebble's A Very Expensive Poison, a stage adaptation of Luke Harding's non-fiction book of the same name. The play is about the assassination of Alexander Litvinenko by means of the invisible radioactive isotope polonium-210.  The play opened at the Old Vic on 5 September 2019, directed by John Crowley. A Very Expensive Poison was nominated at the 2020 Laurence Olivier Awards for Best New Play  and won the Critics' Circle Theatre Award for Best New Play  and Best New Production of a Play at the Broadway World Awards. Prebble was also awarded the 2020 Susan Smith Blackburn Prize.

Television

2007 saw the premiere of Prebble's first television series, Secret Diary of a Call Girl, starring Billie Piper. Prebble wrote for the first two of the show's four seasons, the last of which concluded in March 2011.

Prebble and Piper have collaborated on a further television project, I Hate Suzie which aired in 2020.

Prebble also writes for Frankie Boyle's New World Order and appears on the TV show as a guest as well as appearing occasionally on Have I Got News for You.

Since 2018, Lucy is Co-Executive Producer and writer on the BAFTA, Golden Globe and Emmy award-winning HBO drama Succession, for which she has also won a WGA Award.

Other writing

Prebble contributes to major publications as a journalist and wrote a weekly Tech column for the Observer newspaper.

She was the Head Scene Writer for Bungie's first person shooter video game, Destiny, which was released in 2014.

In June 2018 Prebble was elected Fellow of the Royal Society of Literature in its "40 Under 40" initiative. She was also the recipient of the 2019 Wellcome Screenwriting Fellowship.

Works

TheatreLiquid, 2002The Sugar Syndrome, Jerwood Theatre Upstairs, London, November 2003ENRON, Chichester Festival Theatre / Royal Court Theatre / Noel Coward Theatre, London, 2009; Broadhurst Theatre, New York City, 2010The Effect, National Theatre, 2012; Barrow Street Theatre, New York City, 2016A Very Expensive Poison; Old Vic Theatre, London, 2019

Television Secret Diary of a Call Girl (2007–2011)Succession (2018– )I Hate Suzie (2020– )

 Awards and nominations 

 Theatre 

References

External links
Lucy Prebble at Doollee.com'' Playwrights Database 

"Enron: much ado about money", Prospect, Michael Coveney

1981 births
Living people
English dramatists and playwrights
English television writers
British women television writers
People educated at Guildford High School
Fellows of the Royal Society of Literature
English women dramatists and playwrights
British women screenwriters
21st-century British dramatists and playwrights
21st-century English women writers
21st-century British screenwriters
Video game writers